Allan McKay (born May 1, 1982) is a Los-Angeles based visual effects supervisor and technical director. He is responsible for visual effects sequences in projects including Transformers: Dark of the Moon, Blade, The Last Airbender, Star Trek: Into Darkness, Flight, The Equalizer, and other films. He has also worked on several video games including Halo, Destiny, Call of Duty, Bioshock, Prototype, Half-Life, Team Fortress 2, and others.

His studio CatastrophicFX is located in Los Angeles.

Early life

McKay began sculpting and drawing while young. He sold his artwork to friends so he could buy a second hand IBM 286 computer when he was 11 years old. He started using Deluxe Paint Animation and Animator Pro, populating entire games with his own characters. He developed an interest in filmmaking when he got exposure to POVray, Vista Pro and the 3D Studio R3 for DOS. He got his first big break working for Team Fortress Software working on Team Fortress 2. At the age of 18, he moved to Sydney to work for Ambience Entertainment.

At 17, McKay started teaching advanced courses on game development and 3D animation at QANTM College, as well as evening classes on visual effects. During his time there, he became involved in building the curriculum for Queensland College of Art's Bachelor of Interactive Entertainment, the first university-level curriculum aimed for video games development.

In 2005, he launched his own studio, Catastrophic FX. Within this company, he worked on dozens of game cinematics, TVCs and films.

Career

In 2009, McKay worked on an Australian-American science fiction horror film Daybreakers, as a senior technical director.

Working on the film Priest, in 2011, McKay had to come up with a pipeline for doing a massive sequence of realistic explosions, at a time when that was not common. Michael Bay's Transformers: Dark of the Moon (2011) brought on a challenge of building tools that would construct max files from scratch and FumeFX simulations from that. He used a combination of FumeFX and Karatoa, along with Max's built-in particle system Particle Flow.

In 2012, McKay worked on Flight, directed by Robert Zemeckis, in which he created a giant plane crash which contained over 2,500 frames.

In 2013, he worked on Metallica: Through the Never, as well as J.J. Abrams' Star Trek Into Darkness. He was an FX Animation and Simulation Lead on The Equalizer (2014), directed by Antoine Fuqua.

Video Games

At the age of 14, McKay worked on this first video game project Team Fortress 2. It was originally envisioned as an add-on for Quake. After securing a license to Quake engine by Valve, the release of the game was delayed by a decade. On April 8, 2008, Team Fortress 2 was finally released as a standalone title for Windows. It was developed on the modified Quake engine utilized by Half-Life.

In 2010, McKay joined Prototype, a 2009 open world action adventure video game developed by Activision, as a special effects supervisor and an art guru.

His project BioShock won Game Trailer of the Year award in 2011.

McKay worked on a commercial for God of War, which played during Super Bowl in 2013.

Soon after, he joined the team working on Destiny, also published by Activision in 2014. That same year, he contributed to Halo, 10th Anniversary Edition. In January 2015, he worked on a new project, Call of Duty: Black Ops. III.

Teaching

In addition to his VFX work, McKay runs many courses, as well as a mentorship with over 1,000 members. Throughout the past two decades he has appeared as a speaker at events in over 15 different cities including Paris, Sydney, Los Angeles, New York, Vancouver, Singapore, Helsinki, as well as master classes at SIGGRAPH. He also creates video tutorials on Pluralsight, YouTube, Vimeo, and through his personal website.

His podcast features interviews with artists and directors in the creative industry, focusing on both creativity and drive, as well as tips for a career and success within the creative industry.

Awards
In 2006, McKay won an Emmy Award for Super Bowl XXXIX (2005 TV Special).
He received an Autodesk 3ds Max Master Siggraph Award in 2007, for his contribution to the advancement of computer graphics.  
In 2001, he won Gold at Promax Award in New York, for the Best TV ID (Channel 9 Xmas ID).

References

External links 
 
Allan McKay Filmography Hollywood.com

Living people
Special effects people
1982 births
People from Brisbane